The Ziggurat (or Great Ziggurat) of Ur (Sumerian:    "Etemenniguru", meaning "temple whose foundation creates aura") is a Neo-Sumerian ziggurat in what was the city of Ur near Nasiriyah, in present-day Dhi Qar Province, Iraq. The structure was built during the Early Bronze Age (21st century BC) but had crumbled to ruins by the 6th century BC of the Neo-Babylonian period, when it was restored by King Nabonidus.

Its remains were excavated in the 1920s and 1930s by Sir Leonard Woolley. Under Saddam Hussein in the 1980s, they were encased by a partial reconstruction of the façade and the monumental staircase. The Ziggurat of Ur is the best-preserved of those known from Mesopotamia, besides the ziggurat of Dur Untash (Chogha Zanbil). It is one of three well-preserved structures of the Neo-Sumerian city of Ur, along with the Royal Mausolea and the Palace of Ur-Nammu (the E-hursag).

Sumerian ziggurat

The ziggurat was built by King Ur-Nammu, who dedicated it in honour of Nanna/Sîn in approximately the 21st century BC (short chronology) during the Third Dynasty of Ur. The height is speculative, as only the foundations of the Sumerian ziggurat have survived.

The ziggurat was a piece in a temple complex that served as an administrative center for the city, and which was a shrine of the moon god Nanna, the patron deity of Ur.

The construction of the ziggurat was finished in the 21st century BC by King Shulgi, who, in order to win the allegiance of cities, proclaimed himself a god. During his 48-year reign, the city of Ur grew to be the capital of a state controlling much of Mesopotamia. Many ziggurats were made by stacking mud-bricks up and using mud to seal them together.

Neo-Babylonian restoration
King Nabonidus, the last king of the Neo-Babylonian Empire in the 6th century BC, after "finding little left but the last stage and nothing to guide him as to the monument's original appearance", had it restored in seven stages rather than three.

Excavation and preservation
The remains of the ziggurat were rediscovered by William Loftus in 1850. The first excavations at the site were conducted by John George Taylor (mistakenly credited as "J. E. Taylor") in the 1850s, leading to the identification of the site as Ur.
After World War I, preliminary excavations were performed by Reginald Campbell Thompson and Henry Hall. The site was extensively excavated in the 1920s by Sir Leonard Woolley by appointment of the University Museum of the University of Pennsylvania and the British Museum in the period of 1922 to 1934.

The remains of the ziggurat consist of a three-layered solid mass of mud brick faced with burnt bricks set in bitumen. The lowest layer corresponds to the original  construction of Ur-Nammu, while the two upper layers are part of the Neo-Babylonian restorations. The façade of the lowest level and the monumental staircase were rebuilt under the orders of Saddam Hussein.

The  ziggurat was damaged in the Gulf War in 1991 by small arms fire, and the structure was shaken by explosions. Four bomb craters can be seen nearby, and the walls of the ziggurat are marred by over 400 bullet holes.

As of 2008, the site is under the supervision of curator Dief Mohssein Naiif al-Gizzy.

See also
Abraham
Nasiriyah Airport
Abraham and the temple in Islamic tradition
Ennigaldi-Nanna's museum
Architecture of Mesopotamia
Ur of the Chaldees
Ziggurat of Aqar Quf

References

Further reading
Woolley, C. Leonard and  Moorey, P. R. S.,  Ur of the Chaldees: Revised and Updated Edition of Sir Leonard Woolley's Excavations at Ur, Cornell University Press (1982).

External links

Ziggurat of Ur , Smarthistory at Khan Academy
Ur (modern name: Tell el-Muqayyar) at Open Context
A brief history of the Sumerian Ziggurat at Ur
Archaeology of ancient Iraq with a section on the ziggurat
The Harran and Ur Latitudes, and Tell Göbekli Tepe

Buildings and structures completed in the 21st century BC
Sumerian art and architecture
Ur
Ur
Moon temples